Perak Football Club II, also named as Perak FC II, is the reserve team of Perak FC, based in Ipoh, in the state of Perak. Founded on 30 July 2015 as part of the sports and recreation club for the Perak State Development Corporation Football Club (PKNP). The club was combined with Perak FC at end of 2019 as one club and was re-branded as a football club to be known as Perak FC. The team formerly known PKNP FC was then converted into a reserve team as part of the feeder club regulations and will begin the 2020 season as a reserve team of Perak FC. and will play in Malaysia MFL Cup, holding home games at Manjung Stadium.

Unlike in England, reserve teams in Malaysia play in the same football pyramid as their first team rather than a separate league. However, reserve teams cannot play in the same division as their first team. Therefore, the team is ineligible for promotion to Malaysia Super League, the division in which their parent side competes. Reserve teams are also no longer permitted to enter the cup competitions.

The team is officially will known as Perak FC II, for 2020 Malaysia League seasons, on the club's official promotion and website, but Malaysia League, the governing body of Malaysian football league system rules prohibit reserve teams from having different names than their parent team.

The club was originally dissolved after Perak F.C. confirmed their relegation from the Super League in 2021. However, the team makes a return to the Malaysian league system by joining the reserve league, the MFL Cup from 2023 onwards.

Club licensing regulations

2018 season
 This club had obtained the FAM Club License to play in the 2018 Malaysia Super League season.

2019 season
 This club had obtained the FAM Club License to play in the 2019 Malaysia Super League season.

History
Kelab Bolasepak Perbadanan Kemajuan Negeri Perak (English: Perak State Development Corporation Football Club), or simply PKNP FC is a Malaysian professional football club based in Ipoh, Perak. The club currently plays in the Malaysia Super League. The club also participated in the state and district competitions in the Perak League, Ipoh League and the Malaysia People's Football League as Batang Padang.

The modern-day club was formed on 30 July 2015 by Perak State Development Corporation Group as part of its effort to bring back the legacy of PKNP's sport involvement in the 1980s and 1990s. It also served as a platform by the group bring a positive image to its brand in the state of Perak. As part of having a stable number of grassroots players within the club, the club also send its other feeder squads to compete in the district, state and national level competitions. The club was an obscure local amateur side began playing in the third division Malaysia FAM League. They steadily improved and by 2017 were competing in the Malaysia Premier League and by 2018 in Malaysia Super League.

Colours

Sponsorship

Stadium and locations

Season by season record

Players

Current squad

Coaches

Current coaching staff

Coaches

Affiliated clubs
 Perak
 Batang Padang

References

External links
 Official Website
 Official Facebook Page

Perak F.C.
Malaysia Super League clubs
Malaysia Premier League clubs
Football clubs in Malaysia
Association football clubs established in 2015
2015 establishments in Malaysia
Malaysian reserve football teams